Ama Duncan is a Ghanaian entrepreneur, author and the founder of the Fabulous Woman Network. She is also known for her women empowerment sessions held by the Fabulous Women Network where she is a founder.

Ama has over 13 years’ experience in Human Resources Development and is the CEO of Ama Duncan Consulting through which she consults for businesses and has trained over 2000 professionals. She conducts one-on-one and group coaching for women-led businesses and has also created online courses. Other projects she has facilitated include the Women's Leadership Development Program organised by the Kofi Annan International Peace Keeping Center (KAIPTC), EU-Ghana Circular Economy Conference and GIZ/British Council Jobs For Youth Project. Ama was also the team leader for the curriculum review of the NBU (No Business As Usual) Hub Youth Entrepreneurship and Employability Program.

Ama has authored two books: Yarns of inspiration I and Networking Made Easy.

Education 
Ama is a product of the University of Ghana, Legon where she holds a Bachelor of Arts degree and holds Master's in Business Administration from the Paris Graduate School of Management in France.

References 

Year of birth missing (living people)
Living people
21st-century Ghanaian businesswomen
21st-century Ghanaian businesspeople